Tafadzwa Vintlane Mufambisi is a Zimbabwean cricketer born December 17, 1986, in Glen View who plays ODI cricket for Zimbabwe. He has previously represented Zimbabwe Under-19s and is a right-hand batsman and wicket-keeper.

References
Cricinfo Profile

1986 births
Living people
Mashonaland cricketers
Zimbabwe One Day International cricketers
Zimbabwean cricketers
Wicket-keepers